Players and pairs who neither have high enough rankings nor receive wild cards may participate in a qualifying tournament held one week before the annual Wimbledon Tennis Championships.

Seeds

  Lenka Němečková /  Andreea Vanc (qualifying competition, lucky losers)
  Zsófia Gubacsi /  Katalin Marosi (first round)
  Maja Palaveršić-Coopersmith /  Marie-Ève Pelletier (first round)
  Vanessa Henke /  Evgenia Kulikovskaya (first round)
  Melissa Middleton /  Brie Rippner (qualifying competition)
  Alina Jidkova /  Bryanne Stewart (qualified)
  Kelly Liggan /  Miho Saeki (qualifying competition)
  Hsieh Su-wei /  Shelley Stephens (first round)

Qualifiers

  Alina Jidkova /  Bryanne Stewart
  Renata Kolbovic /  Milagros Sequera
  Anna Hawkins /  Jane O'Donoghue
  Gisela Dulko /  Svetlana Kuznetsova

Lucky losers

  Lenka Němečková /  Andreea Vanc'''

Qualifying draw

First qualifier

Second qualifier

Third qualifier

Fourth qualifier

External links

2002 Wimbledon Championships on WTAtennis.com
2002 Wimbledon Championships – Women's draws and results at the International Tennis Federation

Women's Doubles Qualifying
Wimbledon Championship by year – Women's doubles qualifying
Wimbledon Championships